Ferry Island Provincial Park is a Class C provincial park in British Columbia that is located on the south side of the Fraser River northeast of Rosedale. This park is northwest of Bridal Falls, British Columbia and  adjacent to the Agassiz-Rosedale Bridge. The Ferry Island Park was established in 1963, and it has an area of about 29 hectares. 

Ferry Island Provincial Park is listed as a "Class C" provincial park which is governed by a local community board.

References

Lower Mainland
Provincial parks of British Columbia
1963 establishments in British Columbia
Protected areas established in 1963